Kumluca usually refers to the district center in Antalya Province, Turkey, but may also refer to: 

 Kumluca, Bartın, a town in Bartın Province, Turkey
 Kumluca, Burdur
 Kumluca, Hasankeyf, a village in Batman Province, Turkey
 Kumluca, Sarayköy
 Kumluca, Taşova, a village in Amasya Province, Turkey